Mirandinha may refer to:

Francisco Teixeira de Miranda, also known as Mirandinha, Brazilian slave trader in 1830s-1840s Angola
Mirandinha (footballer, born 1952)
Mirandinha (footballer, born 1959), the first Brazilian to play in English football in 1987